A tripod is a portable three-legged frame or stand, used as a platform for supporting the weight and maintaining the stability of some other object. The three-legged (triangular stance) design provides good stability against gravitational loads as well as horizontal shear forces, and better leverage for resisting tipping over due to lateral forces can be achieved by spreading the legs away from the vertical centre.
Variations with one, two, and four legs are termed monopod, bipod, and quadripod (similar to a table).

Etymology

The earliest attested form of the word is the Mycenaean Greek , ti-ri-po, written in Linear B syllabic script.

Cultural use 

Many cultures, including the ancient peoples of China and Greece, used tripods as ornaments, trophies, sacrificial altars, cooking vessels or cauldrons, and decorative ceramic pottery.  Tripod pottery have been part of the archaeological assemblage in China since the earliest Neolithic cultures of Cishan and Peiligang in the 7th and 8th millennium BC. Sacrificial tripods were found in use in ancient China usually cast in bronze but sometimes appearing in ceramic form. They are often referred to as "dings" and usually have three legs, but in some usages have four legs.

The Chinese use sacrificial tripods symbolically in modern times, such as in 2005, when a "National Unity Tripod" made of bronze was presented by the central Chinese government to the government of northwest China's Xinjiang Uygur Autonomous Region to mark its fiftieth birthday. It was described as a traditional Chinese sacrificial vessel symbolizing unity.

In ancient Greece, tripods were frequently used to support lebes, or cauldrons, sometimes for cooking and other uses such as supporting vases.

Firearms

Tripods are commonly used on machine guns to provide a stable mount for the weapon when firing.

Tripods are generally restricted to heavier weapons where the weight would be an encumbrance. For lighter weapons such as rifles, a bipod is more common. However, in recent times tripod saddles have become popular for precision rifle shooting sports, with the weapon placed in a vise-like rest which is mounted to a tripod head or with the weapon mounted directly to the tripod head.

Telecommunications

Aerials and telecommunication towers may be erected over a tripod structure.

Photography

Surveying

Astronomy
The astronomical tripod is a sturdy three-leg stand used to support telescopes or binoculars, though they may also be used to support attached cameras or ancillary equipment.  The astronomical tripod is normally fitted with an altazimuth or equatorial mount to assist in tracking celestial bodies.

Laboratory 

Laboratory tripod is a portable, three-legged platform equipment, which is usually made of lightweight metal such as stainless steel or aluminium so that it can be moved conveniently within the lab. The main usage is to support or hold the flasks and beakers during experiments.

See also 
 ISO_1222 (tripod screw mount)
 Trivet
 Triskelion

References

External links 
 
 
Complete information of tripods
Firearm components
Photography equipment
Tools

pl:Statyw
sr:Tronožac